Kharino is the name of several rural localities in Russia:
Kharino, Beryozovsky District, Perm Krai, a village in Beryozovsky District, Perm Krai
Kharino, Gaynsky District, Perm Krai, a settlement in Gaynsky District, Perm Krai